"Flying High" is a song recorded by German musician known under the pseudonym of Captain Hollywood Project, released in November 1994 as the first single from his second album, Animals or Human (1995). A fast and strong Eurodance song, it achieved moderate success in several countries. A second CD maxi composed of two new remixes was launched in February 1995. Ten years later, in 2005, a new remix of "Flying High" was released, reaching the Top 20 on European club charts.

Chart performance
"Flying High" was a major hit on the charts across Europe. It reached the top 10 in Austria, Belgium, Denmark, Finland (number four), the Netherlands (number four) and Sweden, as well as on MTV's European Top 20, where it hit number three. Additionally, the single peaked within the top 20 in Germany, Italy and Switzerland, plus on the Eurochart Hot 100, where "Flying High" reached number 15. It was also a top 40 hit in France, and in the UK, it peaked at number 58 in its first week at the UK Singles Chart, on March 26, 1995. In Scotland, it went to number 75. Outside Europe, the song was a huge hit in Israel, peaking at number six.

Critical reception
British magazine Music Week wrote, "Hoping to emulate last year's Top 30 success with Impossible, Flying High is a commercial number that brings to mind the dance/pop success of 2 Unlimited et al."

Music video
The accompanying music video for "Flying High" was directed by Rainer Thieding. He would also direct the video for "The Way Love Is". "Flying High" was later published on YouTube in March 2017. As of September 2020, the video has amassed more than 4 million views.

Track listings

 CD maxi 1 (November 1994)
 "Flying High" (radio mix) — 3:45
 "Flying High" (extended mix) — 6:41
 "Flying High" (belly mix) — 5:25
 "Flying High" (spaceship mix) — 6:05
	
 CD maxi 2 (January 1995)
 "Flying High" (God's groove remix) — 6:34
 "Flying High" (Perplexer remix) — 5:40

Charts

Weekly charts

Year-end charts

References

1994 singles
1994 songs
1995 singles
Captain Hollywood Project songs
Music videos directed by Rainer Thieding
Songs written by Tony Dawson-Harrison